AS Makinku is a football club in Mwene-Ditu, Democratic Republic of Congo.  They play in the Linafoot, the top level of professional football in DR Congo. 

Football clubs in the Democratic Republic of the Congo